The Middle Finger is a mountain in the Five Fingers Group, a group of summits on the divide between Pitt Lake and Coquitlam Lake and north of Widgeon Lake, in British Columbia, Canada. 

The Middle Finger is the highest of the group.

Notes

References
 
 
 

Middle Finger
Pacific Ranges
One-thousanders of British Columbia
New Westminster Land District